Tammo Harder (born 4 January 1994) is a German professional footballer who most recently played as a forward for SV Lippstadt 08 in 2020.

Career

Borussia Dortmund II
Harder made his professional debut in the 3. Liga with Borussia Dortmund II on 20 July 2013 against VfB Stuttgart II.

Holstein Kiel and Saarbrücken loan
In the first half of the 2016–17 season, Harder made three appearances in the 3. Liga scoring 1 goal for Holstein Kiel.

In the 2016–17 winter transfer window, he joined 1. FC Saarbrücken for the second half of the season. At Saarbrücken, he played 5 Regionalliga Südwest matches.

In July 2017, Harder's contract at Holstein Kiel was terminated.

References

External links
 
 
 

1994 births
Living people
German footballers
Association football forwards
Germany youth international footballers
Borussia Dortmund II players
Holstein Kiel players
1. FC Saarbrücken players
SC Wiedenbrück 2000 players
SV Lippstadt 08 players
3. Liga players
Regionalliga players